Likhu may refer to:

Likhu Khola, a left tributary of the Sun Koshi in the Himalayas in eastern Nepal

Rural Municipalities in Nepal
Likhu, Okhaldhunga, a rural municipality in Okhaldhunga District of Province No. 1 of Nepal
Likhu Pike, a rural municipality in Solukhumbu District of Province No. 1 of Nepal
Likhu, Nuwakot, a rural municipality in Nuwakot District of Bagmati Province of Nepal
Likhu Tamakoshi, a rural municipality in Ramechhap District of Bagmati Province of Nepal

Former village development committee
Likhu, Karnali, a village development committee in Dolpa District in the Karnali Zone of north-western Nepal
Likhu, Bagmati, a village development committee in Nuwakot District in the Bagmati Zone of central Nepal